Cerovec may refer to the following places in Slovenia:

Cerovec, Dolenjske Toplice, a village in the Municipality of Dolenjske Toplice
Cerovec, Šentjur, a village in the Municipality of Šentjur
Cerovec, Sevnica, a village in the Municipality of Sevnica
Cerovec pod Bočem, a village in the Municipality of Rogaška Slatina
Cerovec pri Črešnjevcu, a village in the Municipality of Semič
Cerovec pri Trebelnem, a village in the Municipality of Mokronog-Trebelno
Cerovec Stanka Vraza, a village in the Municipality of Ormož
Mali Cerovec, a village in the Municipality of Novo Mesto
Veliki Cerovec, a village in the Municipality of Novo Mesto